Bayar may refer to:

People
 Buren Bayaer (1960–2018), a Chinese Mongol singer, composer, and disc jockey
 Celâl Bayar (1883–1986), a Turkish politician, statesman and the third President of Turkey
 Faruk Bayar (born 1981), a Turkish footballer
 Sanjaagiin Bayar (born 1956), a Mongolian politician and former Prime Minister of Mongolia
 Yesui Bayar (born 2000), a Mongolian swimmer

Other
 Bayar, Kasaragod, a village in the state of Kerala, India
 Celal Bayar University, a state university located in Manisa, Turkey

Turkish-language surnames